

Aston Martin has used the Vantage name on a number of vehicles, normally indicating a high-performance version of another model. In one case, during 1972–1973, the Vantage was a distinct model, being a straight-6 powered version of the DBS, a car that had been launched as a straight-6 but was by that time V8-powered (as the DBS V8).

Visual cues include a unique 2-headlight front clip with DB6-like grille. It was also the last Aston Martin to come equipped with wire wheels. Just 71 examples were built.

The Vantage was the last straight-6 Aston Martin until the 1993 DB7.

References

External links 
Official Aston Martin Site – V8 Vantage Specification and Photos

Vantage
Cars introduced in 1972